Ravne nad Šentrupertom is a small settlement in the hills north of Šentrupert in the Lower Carniola region of southeastern Slovenia. The entire Municipality of Šentrupert is included in the Southeast Slovenia Statistical Region.

Name
The name of the settlement was changed from Ravne to Ravne nad Šentrupertom in 1953.

References

External links
Ravne nad Šentrupertom at Geopedia

Populated places in the Municipality of Šentrupert